Marie-Renée is a feminine French given name. Notable people with the name include:

 Marie-Renée Frossard, French ballerina
 Marie-Renée Lavoie (born 1974), Canadian writer
 Marie-Renée Oget (born 1945), French politician
 Marie-Renée Roudaut (1847-1930) was a French missionary nun
 Marie-Renée Ucciani (1883-1963), French painter and sculptor

Compound given names
French feminine given names